Jemma Louise Connor-Iommi (born 28 May 1985) is a football coach and former player. She most recently played as a defender for London Bees. Connor-Iommi was born in England but represented the Republic of Ireland at senior international level.

Club career
After two years at the national academy for women's football in Gateshead, 18-year-old Connor-Iommi went to America on a scholarship in 2003. She returned home six months into the four-year course due to a weight problem.

Connor-Iommi lost  and played for Doncaster Rovers Belles then West Bromwich Albion Ladies. She joined Premier League Birmingham City in 2008 but continued to appear for West Bromwich Albion (then called Sporting Club Albion) in the Midland Combination.

She also played futsal for Team United Birmingham.

With Birmingham City inactive until the FA WSL started in spring 2011, Connor-Iommi joined Nottingham Forest in the 2010–2011 Premier League. In 2012–13 Connor-Iommi captained Nottingham Forest while also working as a manager in a school.

When Oxford United were elected into FA WSL 2 in 2014 Connor-Iommi signed for them. After playing in every match for Oxford, she joined WSL 2 rivals London Bees ahead of the 2015 campaign. In June 2016, Connor-Iommi returned to West Brom as a development manager.

International career
Connor-Iommi was eligible to play for the Republic of Ireland women's national football team through her Irish father. She was called up for the first time in May 2008. She then went on a tour to America that autumn.

In October 2008 she participated in Ireland's Euro 2009 play-off defeat by Iceland, under the name Jemma O'Connor.

Personal life
Tony Iommi is Jemma's mother's cousin. In 2009 Connor-Iommi worked as a warrant officer, which she described as: "knocking on offenders' doors and hoping not to get your head kicked in".

References

External links
Nottingham Forest profile
FAI profile

Living people
1985 births
Sportspeople from Sutton Coldfield
British people of Irish descent
Republic of Ireland women's international footballers
Republic of Ireland women's association footballers
FA Women's National League players
Women's Super League players
London Bees players
Birmingham City W.F.C. players
Doncaster Rovers Belles L.F.C. players
Nottingham Forest Women F.C. players
Republic of Ireland women's futsal players
Women's association football central defenders
Women's association football midfielders
Oxford United W.F.C. players